The Vietnam Software Association, known for short as VINASA, is a software business association headquartered in Hanoi Software Centre, Hanoi, Vietnam. It was established in 2002. In 2005, they signed a cooperation agreement with the Japan External Trade Organization (JETRO). Among other activities, they organise an annual software contest; in 2006, they gave out 36 prizes to various individuals and organisations.

References

External links
 VINASA

2002 establishments in Vietnam
Business organizations based in Vietnam
Science and technology in Vietnam
Scientific organizations based in Vietnam
Organizations established in 2002